Feras Antoon (born 29 June 1975) is a Syrian-Canadian pornographer, and the co-owner and CEO of MindGeek, the world's largest pornography company, which runs sites including YouPorn and Pornhub. He created his first porn website in the early 2000s before co-founding Brazzers, which specialized in the MILF segment of porn distribution, which depicts sexually attractive older women. He and David Tassillo later bought Manwin (MindGeek) from Fabian Thylmann.

Early life
Feras Antoon was born on 29 June 1975 in the city of Damascus, Syria, before immigrating to Canada. A resident of Montreal, he graduated with an engineering degree from Montreal's Concordia University.

Career
In the early 2000s, with four other recent Concordia engineering graduates, he created his first porn website for Mansef Productions. The company was run by Stéphane Manos, and Antoon would become his brother-in-law.

Their first porn company, Brazzers, was set up in about 2005 by Ouissam Youssef, Matt Keezer, Stephane Manos, and Feras Antoon with the company name being an allusion/homage to their mainly Middle Eastern origins, and their pronunciation of "Brothers". Brazzers focused on the sexualization of MILFs. According to Antoon, "At first, they focused on busty women, because the big tits niche was so cheap. They realized that the MILF niche – the older-women niche – is even bigger. And they became masters of the big-tit-MILF niche". Further expansion led to sites including YouPorn, before all the businesses were sold to German businessman Fabian Thylmann for an estimated $140 million.

In January 2011, commenting on paid and free ("tube") porn sites, Antoon said, "I personally have one or two memberships, and I still go to the tubes. I get my appetizer on the tubes, my main course on one of the sites."

Following his extradition from Belgium to Germany in 2012, on charges of tax evasion, Fabian Thylmann, the owner of Manwin (which changed its name to MindGeek in 2013) sold the company to its two senior managers, Antoon and COO David Tassillo, for a reported €73 million. Antoon is the CEO of MindGeek (formerly Manwin), which in 2014 was described as a "porn monopoly".

By 2016, the Autorité des marchés financiers (AMF) in Montreal had executed search warrants and obtained cease-trade orders for 13 people, with allegations of insider trading including Antoon, David Baazov, Josh Baazov, and John Chatzidakis.

Personal life
Antoon lives in Montreal, Canada. He is married to Nicole Manos, a Canadian of Greek descent. The couple have two sons. Nicole is the daughter of George Manos and Louise Laberge Manos (1952–2017). His brother Mark Antoon is a vice-president of MindGeek. Antoon's Can$19-million dollar mansion in the 'Mafia Row' neighbourhood of Montreal burnt down in a suspected arson on 26 April 2021.

References

1975 births
Living people
Canadian chief executives
Canadian pornographers
Concordia University alumni
MindGeek
Canadian people of Syrian descent
People from Damascus
Syrian emigrants to Canada